Sam Cunningham is an American politician who was elected as the first African-American mayor of Waukegan, Illinois, the largest city in and the county seat of Lake County, Illinois.

Biography
Cunningham was born and raised in Waukegan. He is a graduate of Waukegan East High School and Central State University where he earned a B.S. in Business Administration and Marketing. After college, he established his own business as an insurance agent. In 1975, he joined the Waukegan Police Department as an officer. In 1999, he was elected as alderman for the 1st Ward in Waukegan. In 2017, he defeated independent Lisa May, who at the time would have been the city's first female mayor. He was the first African-American to serve as mayor in Waukegan.

Tenure as Mayor 
Cunningham proposed the development of a casino on the vacant land that used to house Lakehurst Mall. In 2019, with the signing of the Rebuild Illinois Act by governor J. B. Pritzker, six new casinos were to be constructed, including one in Waukegan. As of 2021, no operator had been chosen to construct and manage the proposed casino site.

Another vision he had for the city was the transformation of the lake-front to a "northern Navy Pier" of Lake County. This vision included the establishment of recreational, commercial, and residential areas along the abandoned industrial areas of the shore. Critics of this objected to it, as they claimed that the city did not have sufficient funds to accomplish this goal.

During the month of April 2019, Sam Cunningham and his mother, Lake County Board vice-chair Mary Ross Cunningham, were sued for allegedly violating the First Amendment rights of a Waukegan resident. The mayor allegedly threatened to revoke the resident's public housing voucher and potentially arrest the resident if he did not remove an altered image that depicted the two as devils. The lawsuit reached a settlement of $17,000, with the county paying $12,000 and the city paying $5,000.

He lost the election to alderwoman Ann B. Taylor, by a margin of 11%.

Personal life
Cunningham has two daughters, Syerra and Samantha. Cunningham is a 2017 Jim Edgar Fellow, the U.S. Minority Contractors Association 2017 Municipal Administrator of the Year, and the recipient of the Illinois Black Chamber of Commerce Parren J. Mitchell Outstanding Service Award. He is a member of Kappa Alpha Psi.

References
Sam Cunningham Waukegan Mayor

21st-century American politicians
African-American mayors in Illinois
Mayors of places in Illinois
People from Waukegan, Illinois
Central State University alumni
Year of birth missing (living people)
Living people
21st-century African-American politicians